Tendai Machiri (born 2 April 1985) is a Zimbabwean cricketer. He made his first-class debut for Southerns in the 2006–07 Logan Cup on 26 April 2007.

References

External links
 

1985 births
Living people
Zimbabwean cricketers
Southern Rocks cricketers
Southerns (Zimbabwe) cricketers
Sportspeople from Harare